Fuscideaceae is a family of fungi in the order Umbilicariales. It contains seven genera.

References

Umbilicariales
Taxa described in 1984
Taxa named by Josef Hafellner
Lecanoromycetes families
Lichen families